Dimethyl sulfide:cytochrome c2 reductase is an enzyme with systematic name dimethyl sulfide:cytochrome-c2 oxidoreductase. It is also known by the name dimethylsulfide dehydrogenase (Ddh). This enzyme catalyses the following chemical reaction

 dimethyl sulfide + 2 ferricytochrome c2 + H2O  dimethyl sulfoxide + 2 ferrocytochrome c2 + 2 H+

The enzyme from the bacterium Rhodovulum sulfidophilum binds molybdopterin guanine dinucleotide, heme b and [4Fe-4S] clusters. It is a heterotrimeric protein with three subunits, the Molybdopterin DdhA, the [4Fe-4S] DdhB, and the heme-binding DdhC. The subunits share homology with other DMSO reductase family enzymes; one example with all three subunits mapped is ethylbenzene hydroxylase from Aromatoleum aromaticum.

References

External links 
 

EC 1.8.2